The 2017 Mekong Club Championship Final was the final match of the 2017 Mekong Club Championship, the 4th season of a football tournament in the Greater Mekong Subregion organised by Toyota.

The final was contested in two-legged home-and-away format between Vietnam team Sanna Khánh Hòa BVN the 6th place of the 2017 V.League 1 and Thailand team SCG Muangthong United the winners of the 2017 Thai League Cup. The first leg was hosted by Sanna Khánh Hòa BVN at the Hàng Đẫy Stadium in Hanoi on 23 December 2017, while the second leg was hosted by SCG Muangthong United at the Supachalasai Stadium in Bangkok on 6 January 2018. SCG Muangthong United won the final 7–1 at overall and clinched their first title.

Road to the final

In the semi-finals round, Sanna Khánh Hòa BVN beat Laos team Lao Toyota 2–0, while a football club from Thailand has qualified to the final automatically because the defending champions was a football club from Thailand.

Match

Summary

|}

First leg

Assistant referees:
 Mohd Yusri bin Muhamad
 Mohd Khalid bin Mohd Aris
Fourth official:
 Muhd Nazmi Nasaruddin
Match Commissioner:
 Kanya Koemany
General Coordinator:
 Ngô Thị Phương Thảo

Second leg

Assistant referees:
 Lim Kok Heng
 Abdul Hannan
Fourth official:
 Nathan Chan Rong De
Match Commissioner:
 Trần Thị Lan Hương
General Coordinator:
 Rumpha Varaveerakul

Winners

References

2017
2017 in Vietnamese football
2017 in Thai football